António Rocha may refer to:

Tony Rocha (born 1993), American soccer player
António Rocha (fado singer) (born 1938), Portuguese fado singer
Antonio Rocha (mime), Brazilian-American mime and storyteller